Nangavalli block  is a revenue block of Salem district of the Indian state of Tamil Nadu. This revenue block consist of 9 panchayat villages:
 Avadathur
 Chinnasoragai
 Gonur
 Karikkapatti
 Periyasoragai
 Sanarapatti
 Surapalli
 Thoramangalam
 Veerakkal

References 

Revenue blocks of Salem district